Hermann Tebily (born 24 January 2002) is a French professional footballer who plays as a forward for Ligue 2 club Sochaux.

Professional career
A youth product of Olympique Lyonnais, Tebily signed with Sochaux in the summer of 2020. He made his professional debut with Sochaux in a 1–1 Ligue 2 tie with Pau FC on 17 April 2021.

Personal life
Born in France, Tebily is of Ivorian descent.

References

External links
 
 OL Profile
 FDB Profile

2002 births
Living people
Footballers from Paris
French footballers
French sportspeople of Ivorian descent
FC Sochaux-Montbéliard players
Ligue 2 players
Championnat National 3 players
Association football wingers